Inke Maris (7 December 1948 – 31 December 2020) was an Indonesian journalist, newscaster, and communication consultant. She was well known as a first Indonesian who can interviewed Prime Minister of the United Kingdom Margaret Thatcher.

She worked on BBC World Service Indonesian Section (1969–1982) and on TVRI (1982–2001).

She earned master's degree in the field of mass communications from University of Leicester.

She died on 31 December 2020.

References 

1948 births
2020 deaths
Indonesian journalists
Indonesian women journalists
Alumni of the University of Leicester
People from Bogor